Phalkot is one of the 51 union councils of Abbottabad District in Khyber-Pakhtunkhwa province of Pakistan.  It is situated in Abbottabad, N.W.F.P., Pakistan, its geographical coordinates are 34° 9' 0" North, 73° 23' 0" East.  Its original name (with diacritics) is Phalkot.

Subdivisions
Phalkot
Kutly
[[Malsah]

Language 
Hindko/Potohari is widely spoken throughout the area, Urdu being national language also understand and spoken here. English is spoken and understood by some people.

Climate and crops
As this area is away from sea and is above the sea level its winters are extreme. Winter lasts from October to April. April tends to be quite pleasant as the climate is temperate. The summer season is very pleasant and humid the temperature rises maximum to 25-30 degree, due to which it is good picnic spot.

From mid July to mid August people enjoy the fifth season, monsoon, which provides relief after the hot months (i.e., May and June). Farming is the main occupation of the people. The farming is done by oxen in the remote area of village but in proper village is ploughed by machinery because of accessibility. The two crops are grown there: rabi and kharaif. The major rabi crop grown here are potato and maize. The kharaif crop grown there is only wheat but in very small area of village. There are two main purpose of this crop: for cattle and for grain.

Some vegetable are also found here like turnip, radish, peas, pumpkin, beans and mustard.

References

Union councils of Abbottabad District

fr:Phalkot